Joseph T. Salerno (born 1950) is an American Austrian School economist who is Professor Emeritus of Economics in the Finance and Graduate Economics departments at the Lubin School of Business at Pace University, Academic Vice President of the Ludwig von Mises Institute, and holds the John V. Denson II Endowed Professorship in the economics department at Auburn University. He earned his B.A. at Boston College and his M.A. and Ph.D. at Rutgers University.

Early life
Salerno's parents immigrated to the United States from Italy. As a child, he observed his "New Deal Democrat" father's disdain for a visiting relative from Italy who declared himself a member of the communist party there. Salerno said that following the incident, he became a supporter of Barry Goldwater's 1964 presidential candidacy and a "full-fledged Goldwaterite." Thereafter, Salerno decided that he wanted to study economics. As an undergraduate at Boston College, he read an article written by Murray Rothbard and adopted what he describes as "the pure libertarian position... anarcho-capitalism." This, he stated, led to his interest in the Austrian School.

Career in economics
Salerno has published over 50 scholarly articles and books and is the editor of the Quarterly Journal of Austrian Economics. He is a recognized expert on monetary theory and policy, international monetary reform, and Austrian economics and has testified before the United States Congress on the topics of inflation and of reserve fractional reserve banking.

He has also published numerous op-eds online at mises.org, forbes.com, Christian Science Monitor, Wall Street Oasis, and Economic Policy Journal. He is frequently interviewed on broadcast and online radio programs including Bloomberg Radio and has appeared on C-SPAN, Fox News, and the Fox Business Networks. Salerno's theories have been explicated by Israel Kirzner in a survey of Austrian thought on entrepreneurship.

Bibliography 
 Money, Sound and Unsound (Full Text) (2010)

Notes

External links
 Pace University faculty biography
 
 Mises.org faculty biography
 Mises.org Salerno daily articles archive
 Mises.org Salerno media archive
 Autobiography detailing Salerno's intellectual development

American people of Italian descent
American libertarians
American anarcho-capitalists
Austrian School economists
Boston College alumni
Pace University faculty
Mises Institute people
Rutgers University alumni
Living people
1950 births